Budyonnovsk is an air base of the Russian Air Force as part of the 4th Air and Air Defence Forces Army, Southern Military District.

The base is home to the 368th Assault Aviation Regiment (368th ShAP) which has two squadrons of Sukhoi Su-25SM/SM3 (NATO: Frogfoot-A) and the 487th Independent Combat Control Helicopter Regiment.

The 386th deployed to Millerovo (air base) as part of the 2022 Russian invasion of Ukraine.

References

Russian Air Force bases
Buildings and structures in Stavropol Krai